Qarah Aghaj (also Romanized as Qarah Āghāj and Qareh Āghāj; also known as Ghareh Aghaj, Qaraghāch, Qarah Āqāj, and Qareh Āqāj) is a village in Deymkaran Rural District, Salehabad District, Bahar County, Hamadan Province, Iran. At the 2006 census, its population was 517, in 111 families.

References 

Populated places in Bahar County